David Muldrow Beasley (born February 26, 1957) is an American politician and the Executive Director of the United Nations World Food Programme. A member of the Republican Party, he served one term as the 113th Governor of South Carolina from 1995 until 1999 before losing reelection to Democrat Jim Hodges. He also served as a state representative from 1981 until 1995.

Early political career
Elected to the South Carolina House of Representatives at age 20, Beasley transferred from Clemson University to the University of South Carolina where he received a BA in Interdisciplinary Studies in 1979 and a J.D. from the School of Law in 1983. Beasley was a member of the South Carolina House representing the Society Hill area from 1979 until 1995, serving as majority whip from 1985 to 1986 and the majority leader from 1987 to 1989. He served as the youngest Speaker pro tempore and Majority Leader in the nation. 

During the 1991–92 legislative session Beasley switched to the Republican Party. During the 1994 election for governor, both Beasley and his Democratic opponent Lieutenant Governor Nick Theodore faced tough primary opposition within their respective parties. Beasley defeated his toughest competitor, former congressman and state senator Arthur Ravenel Jr., in both the primary and run-off, and went on to win the general election by a narrow margin of 50%–48%.

Governor

South Carolina had a strong economy while Beasley was governor, with unemployment at a record-low 3.5% in 1998.
 Beasley often made known his Christ-centered beliefs and conservatism in a state known for its strong ties to Christianity and conservative politics.

Beasley strongly opposed gambling, which was legal in South Carolina until 2002. At the time, many gas stations, convenience stores, and poker "casinos" were established across the state, and as Beasley supported legislation that would outlaw gambling, the video poker industry generated "Ban Beasley" billboards and radio ads.

Until 2000, the Confederate flag flew atop the South Carolina State House. It had been raised over the Capitol dome in celebration of the Civil War centennial. This celebration started in 1961 with the raising of the Army of Tennessee Battle Flag over the State House Dome. The Army of Tennessee Battle Flags were also displayed in the inner chambers of the SC Senate and SC House of Representatives. 

Beasley initially supported the flag's presence but announced on statewide television in 1996 that he had reversed his decision and believed the flag should be relocated to a monument elsewhere on the grounds. Beasley's position on the Confederate flag cost him many Republican votes in the next election. The flag was removed from the capitol dome in 2000 after Beasley left office. It was displayed on a pole in front of the statehouse until it was removed from the grounds in 2015 after the Emanuel Nine shooting. 

Beasley also faced allegations of having an affair with his former press secretary, Ginny Wolfe. Beasley refuted the claims, saying, "I can tell you right up front [my wife] Mary Wood and I love each other dearly. We both have been faithful to one another 100 percent." 

In the 1998 South Carolina gubernatorial election, Beasley lost to Democrat Jim Hodges, 53% to 45%.

Later career

Post-governor

In 2000, after leaving office as governor, Beasley supported George W. Bush in the South Carolina Republican presidential primary. He introduced Bush during a campaign speech at Bob Jones University, which drew controversy because of the fundamentalist school's anti-Catholic teaching and strict policy against interracial dating. Referring to Bush's anti-abortion stance, Beasley said Bush "shares our values."

After his term as governor, Beasley was a fellow at Harvard Kennedy School. In 2003, he received the John F. Kennedy Profile in Courage Award from U.S. Senator Ted Kennedy for his controversial request to the South Carolina legislature to remove the Confederate flag from the South Carolina statehouse dome.

In 2004, Beasley unsuccessfully ran for the United States Senate to replace retiring Democrat Fritz Hollings. He lost the Republican nomination to Congressman Jim DeMint of Greenville, South Carolina. In April 2005, Beasley, along with his administration's former chief legal counsel, Henry Deneen, incorporated the Center for Global Strategies, Ltd (CGS). CGS focuses on developmental initiatives in the non-integrated world. Beasley is chairman of the board.

In 2007, Beasley endorsed Mike Huckabee in the 2008 Republican presidential primaries. In 2010, he endorsed Henry McMaster in the South Carolina Republican gubernatorial primaries..

World Food Programme

In February 2017, United States Ambassador to the United Nations Nikki Haley (also a former South Carolina governor) nominated Beasley to be the next Executive Director of the World Food Programme (WFP). United Nations Secretary-General António Guterres and U.N. Food and Agriculture Organization José Graziano da Silva officially appointed Beasley to the post in March 2017, saying he brought "extensive experience with key governmental and business leaders and stakeholders around the world, with very strong resource mobilisation skills." Guterres also said Beasley had been among 23 applications/nominations for the position. 

In his capacity as Executive Director of WFP, Beasley serves at the level of Under-Secretary-General of the United Nations and is a member of the organization's Senior Management Group (SMG) under Guterres. Since 2019, he has been a member of the World Economic Forum High-Level Group on Humanitarian Investing, co-chaired by Børge Brende, Kristalina Georgieva and Peter Maurer.

In December 2020, Beasley accepted the Nobel Peace Prize on behalf of the WFP for its efforts to combat world hunger.

As the term of the director of the World Food Programme is five years, Beasley's term was originally set to expire in April of 2022. However, United Nations Secretary-General António Guterres extended Beasley's term, citing the current food crisis of the Russo-Ukrainian War and the COVID-19 pandemic. President Biden initially opposed extending Beasley's term, but bipartisan support in Congress encouraged Biden to support the extension. Beasley's term as executive director is expected to expire April 2023.

Other activities
 SDG2 Advocacy Hub, Co-Chair of the Steering Committee (since 2017)
 Scaling Up Nutrition (SUN), Member of the Lead Group (since 2017)
 Peace Research Endowment (PRE), Member of the Board of Directors (since 2011)
 2003 – John F. Kennedy Profile in Courage Award
 2020 – Nobel Peace Prize awarded to the World Food Programme

Personal life
Beasley is married to Mary Wood Beasley. Beasley currently resides in Rome, Italy, the global headquarters of WFP.

Notes

References

External links

SCIway Biography of David Muldrow Beasley
NGA Biography of David Muldrow Beasley
 
 1995 David Muldrow Beasley Swearing in Ceremony on South Carolina Educational Television
 2020 Nobel Prize lecture: World Food Programme, Nobel Peace Prize 2020

|-

|-

|-

|-

|-

1957 births
20th-century American politicians
American officials of the United Nations
Clemson University alumni
Executive Directors of the World Food Programme
Governors of South Carolina
Harvard Kennedy School people
Living people
Members of the South Carolina House of Representatives
People from Darlington, South Carolina
People from Lamar, South Carolina
People from Society Hill, South Carolina
Republican Party governors of South Carolina
South Carolina Democrats
South Carolina Republicans
University of South Carolina alumni
Recipients of orders, decorations, and medals of Sudan